Bottiaeans or Bottiaei were an ancient people of uncertain origin, living in Central Macedonia. Sometime, during the Archaic period, they were expelled by Macedonians from Bottiaea to Bottike. During the Classical era, they played an active role in the military history of ancient Chalcidice, but after the Macedonian conquest under Philip II nothing remained except the names of these two regions and the adjective Bottiaean, which was limited to sole geographical meaning. Unlike other tribes of Macedonia ruled by kings or living in villages, Bottiaeans developed some polis form of self-government. Unfortunately, no Bottiaean individual is known to us and the limited historical or archaeological sources shed no further light.

Origin
According to Strabo, the Bottiaeans were Cretans who sailed with Minos to Sicily, but on the voyage back they were driven out of their course and reached Macedonia. They were named Bottiaeans after their leader , Botton, in pre-Argead Macedonia (Emathia), most of which, as Strabo says, was held by Bottiaeans and Thracians, as well as Paionians and Epirotes.

According to Plutarch, they were Athenian slaves of Minoan Crete:

The same story is related by the Roman-era mythographer Conon. Homer and early Epic poets make no mention of them. Herodotus in 7.185.1 lists them along with various other tribes in the Xerxes I's European army. In 8.127.1:

Thucydides (2.99) includes Bottiaeans with other deported nations by Macedonians. They were deported from Bottiaea to Bottike after the expulsion of the Pieres from Pieria to Pieris. According to The Cambridge Ancient History: 

However, if two 6th and early 5th century BC cow-and-calf coins found in Bottiaea belong to Bottiaeans, it seems that not all of them were expelled.

Some toponyms of Bottiaea have been proposed as having Cretan origin (Gortynia - Gortys, Axius - Oaxos, Europos - Europa etc.) but nothing is conclusive. Various origins have been speculated: for example, Minoan, Athenian and Mycenaean.

League
Spartolos the chief city of Bottiaeans in Bottike, was one of the first (454 BC) and stable members of the Delian League under the Thracian phoros. It appears in most of the Athenian tribute lists except in 446/5 BC; there we have the phrase Bottiaeans and s.. , which may be read as Bottiaeans and Spartolos or Bottiaeans and synteleis (contributors).

No doubt the Bottiaean league was formed between 432 and 421. In the beginning of the Peloponnesian War, Bottiaeans and Chalcidians revolted from the Athenian Empire (432 BC, Thuc. 1.57). In 429 BC  the Athenians arriving before Spartolus in Bottike, they destroyed the corn and had some hopes of the city coming over through the intrigues of a faction. In the battle of Spartolos,  the heavy Chalcidian infantry, the Spartolian psiloi  and peltasts from Crusis and Olynthus,  jointly defeated the Athenian army  and set up a trophy, took up their dead, and dispersed to their several cities (Thuc. 2.79.1).

In 425 BC Bottiaeans and Chalcidians defeated again the Athenian general Simonides (Thuc.4.7.1), when he attacked Eion. However, in the Athenian tribute list of 425/4 BC, Spartolians is mentioned. The name is partly restored. Only ΣΠ is legible and since no other name in the Thracian phoros begins with Sp, the restoration seems inevitable. Olynthus  also is listed next.

In 422 BC or after, before or as a consequence of the Peace of Nicias, Athenians made a special alliance and oath with Bottiaeans. As the inscription reads with the  boule and strategoi of Bottiaeans, as well the other archontes  of the Bottiaean cities. Not all the names of the cities are legible; only Kalindoia,  Tripoiai, Kemakai or Kamakai and Aioleion or Haioleion. This mention of Kalindoia, a city of Mygdonia, means that Bottike may refer either to regions of Mygdonia and Chalcidice, inhabited by Bottiaeans or that Bottiaean cities existed also outside of geographical Bottike.

In early 4th century BC, Bottiaeans are mentioned, for the last time, in a treaty between Amyntas III and the Chalcidians:  With the Amphipolitans, Bottiaeans, Acanthians and Mendaeans, they shall not make friendship, neither Amyntas nor the Chalcidians separately, but with common consent;.

As for the  silver and bronze coinage of Bottice (Βοττιαίων, of Bottiaeans) it may be categorized to : 1. the same type of Chalcidian League coins (Apollo or Artemis with cithara or lyre) which means that they were at that time allies of Chalcidians. 2. Demeter and forepart of bull in incuse square.

There were between six and twelve  Bottiaean cities: Spartolos, Kalindoia, Kamakai, Tripoiai, Haioleion and Olynthos (until 479). Other six cities can be classified as probable Bottiaean: Kithas, Tinde, Prassilos, Pleume, Sinos and Thamiskos.

Aftermath
In the Hellenistic and Roman era the name Bottiaean  denotes of the Bottiaea district. In epigraphy, the Macedonians for clarification used the suffix -eatai   , Botteatai, Botteatôn  (cf. Italiotes and Egyptiotes). It may refer either to coins or to the inhbabitans of Bottiaea.

The phrase of Stephanus of Byzantium that Nikaea in Bithynia was a colony of Bottiaeans (Bottiaiôn apoikos) may mean  that Lysimachus used as colonists population from Bottiaea or Bottike. The citizens of Kalindoia must have been relocated somewhere else, since the city was given to Macedonians. Some towns of Bottike may also have been among the 26 relocated settlements  under Cassander for the creation of Thessalonica.

References
The Bottiaians and their poleis by Pernille Flensted-Jensen - Studies in the ancient Greek polis By Mogens Herman Hansen, Kurt A. Raaflaub Page 103 -132   (1995)

Ancient tribes in Macedonia
Cretan mythology